Goniurosaurus luii is a species of gecko, a lizard in the family Eublepharidae. The species is endemic to China and Vietnam.

Etymology
The specific name, luii, is in honor of Chinese herpetologist Wai Lui.

Description
Dorsally, G. luii is dark bluish brown, with widely spaced, narrow white crossbands on the head, body, and tail. The first white crossband begins at one corner of the mouth and continues around the back of the head to the other corner of the mouth.

Reproduction
G. luii is oviparous.

References

Further reading
Grismer, L. Lee; Viets, Brian E.; Boyle, Lawrence J. (1999). "Two new continental species of Goniurosaurus (Squamata: Eublepharidae) with a phylogeny and evolutionary classification of the genus". Journal of Herpetology 33 (3): 382-393. (Goniourosaurus luii, new species).

Goniurosaurus
Reptiles of China
Reptiles of Vietnam
Reptiles described in 1999